Julio César Jobet Bourquez  (January 18, 1912 – 1980) was a Chilean Marxist historian. He was descendant of French and Spanish agricultural colonists who arrived to La Araucanía Region in the aftermath of the Occupation of Araucanía. He was a detractor of historian Jaime Eyzaguirre whom he criticized in harsh terms.

Memoria Chilena lists his most important works as:
Los fundamentos del marxismo (1939)
Santiago Arcos Arlegui y la sociedad de la Igualdad: Un socialista utopista Chileno (1942)
Ensayo crítico del desarrollo económico-social de Chile (1951)
Luis Emilio Recabarren: los orígenes del movimiento obrero y del socialismo chileno (1955)
Los precursores del pensamiento social de Chile (1956)
El Partido Socialista de Chile (1971).

References

Chilean schoolteachers
1912 births
1980 deaths
Chilean people of French descent
Chilean people of Spanish descent
People from Cautín Province
University of Chile alumni
Academic staff of the University of Chile
Chilean Marxist historians
20th-century Chilean historians
20th-century Chilean male writers
Chilean socialists